Paul Frehm (1904 - 1986) was a cartoonist who worked on the comic strip Ripley's Believe It or Not. He received the National Cartoonist Society Newspaper Panel Cartoon Award for his work on the strip in 1976.

References

External links
NCS Awards
Lambiek Comiclopedia article.

American comic strip cartoonists
American comics artists
1904 births
1986 deaths
Ripley's Believe It or Not!